Ur jordens djup is the fourth full-length Finntroll album. It was released on March 28, 2007. The album is the first to feature vocalist Mathias Lillmåns, who replaced Tapio Wilska in 2006. Unlike in Nattfödd, the lyrics for this album were written by the band's original vocalist, Jan "Katla" Jämsen.

This and other factors appear to contribute to a darker, more black metal feel. A music video for "Nedgång" was released in April.

Concept 
The band approached the founding member Jämsen about writing the lyrics for this album. He chose to continue a semi-mythical saga which has been touched upon throughout Finntroll's career. The "kingshaman of the trolls" character Rivfader (Ripfather), was first introduced in their first demo, fittingly titled "Rivfader" (re-recorded for Midnattens widunder), but Jämsen has said that the story truly originated in the song "Födosagan" on the second album, Jaktens tid. The song "Eliytres", from Nattfödd, also makes reference to Rivfader.

Aside from this, the lyrical concept for this album was based on Nordic myths, the Kalevala (the Finnish national epic), history and stories of Jämsen's own creation. He has stated that the focus has moved from conflict between pagan and Christian beliefs, to being more concerned with the nature of myth, symbolism, and the origin of all mythology. This is meant to complement the old-and-new dynamic of the musical aspect of Finntroll, which mixes traditional folk music with very modern metal music.

The narrative of the album itself concerns a struggle between witches and troll-shamans, the death and resurrection of Rivfader, the "journey and odyssey of the shaman" and the "great war against one-self".

Track listing 

All lyrics by Katla.
Tracks 1-3, 7, 9-11 music by Trollhorn.
Tracks 4 and 5 music by Trollhorn/Tundra.
Track 6 music by Tundra.
Track 8 music by Routa/Trollhorn.

Personnel
 Mikael "Routa" Karlbom – guitar
 Mathias "Vreth" Lillmåns – vocals
 Samuli "Skrymer" Ponsimaa – guitar, backing vocals
 Samu "Beast Dominator" Ruotsalainen – drums and percussion, backing vocals
 Henri "Trollhorn" Sorvali – keyboards, acoustic guitar, banjo, mouth harp, backing vocals
 Sami "Tundra" Uusitalo – bass, backing vocals

Additional personnel
 Antti "Perish" Eräkangas – guitar solo on "Maktens Spira"
 Petri Eskelinen – shouting
 Katla - lyrics

Production
 Nino Laurenne – engineer, mixing
 Mika Jussila – mastering

References

TrollHorn Post on Finntroll Forum
Imperiumi Press ReleaseIn Finnish

Finntroll albums
2007 albums
Concept albums